Nasiruddin Mahmud Shah may refer to:

 Nasiruddin Mahmud (eldest son of Iltutmish), governor of Bengal (r. 1227–1229)
 Nasiruddin Mahmud Shah, Sultan of Delhi (r. 1246–1265)
 Mahmud Shah of Bengal (r. 1435–1459), Sultan of Bengal